Karol Križan (born June 5, 1980 in Žilina, Czechoslovakia, now Slovakia) is a professional Slovak professional ice hockey goaltender currently playing for HKM Rimavská Sobota in the Slovak 2. Liga.

Career 
Križan played three and a half seasons with Modo Hockey of the Swedish Elitserien between September 2005 and December 2008.

In the play of Modo against Timrå IK he scored a goal and recorded a shutout at the same time. He also led Modo to the Swedish Championship in 2007 with the help of his backup Michal Zajkowski. On December 17, 2008, he left Modo and moved to HC Ambrì-Piotta. On June 30, 2009, he returned to his homeland Slovakia to sign for MHC Martin.

Krizan was loaned to HK Detva of the Slovak 1.Liga during the season, playing four games there. Krizan then left Detva and Martin to sign with Växjö Lakers Hockey of the HockeyAllsvenskan on January 2, 2011. After the end of the 2010–11 season, Krizan was not offered an extended contract with Växjö. On July 28, 2011, Krizan signed a one-year contract with the Serie A team Sportverein Ritten-Renon. Before the 2013 season, Krizan signed a contract with Tønsberg Vikings in the Norwegian Get-ligaen.

International 
Krizan played with the Slovakia men's national ice hockey team in the 2004, 2005 and 2006 Men's World Ice Hockey Championships, as well as the 2006 Winter Olympics.

References

https://web.archive.org/web/20131224205904/http://tonsberghockey.no/index.php

External links
 
 Karol Krizan on Hockeyligan.se – SEL homepage

1980 births
Living people
HC Ambrì-Piotta players
HC 07 Detva players
Ice hockey players at the 2006 Winter Olympics
MHk 32 Liptovský Mikuláš players
MHC Martin players
Modo Hockey players
HC Nové Zámky players
Olympic ice hockey players of Slovakia
Sportspeople from Žilina
Ritten Sport players
Slovak ice hockey goaltenders
Tønsberg Vikings players
Växjö Lakers players
MsHK Žilina players
HKM Zvolen players
Slovak expatriate ice hockey players in Sweden
Slovak expatriate sportspeople in Italy
Slovak expatriate sportspeople in Norway
Slovak expatriate ice hockey players in Switzerland
Expatriate ice hockey players in Italy
Expatriate ice hockey players in Norway